Seeshaupt station is a railway station in the municipality of Seeshaupt, located in the Weilheim-Schongau district in Bavaria, Germany.

References

External links
 
 Seeshaupt layout 
 

Railway stations in Bavaria
Buildings and structures in Weilheim-Schongau